Miss Thailand Universe 2008 was the 9th Miss Thailand Universe pageant held at the Aksra Theatre, King Power Complex, in Bangkok, Thailand on May 24, 2008. In the final round, broadcast live on BBTV Channel 7, Gavintra Photijak, was crowned Miss Thailand Universe 2008 by Farung Yuthithum, Miss Thailand Universe 2007.

Two months later, in July 2008, Gavintra Photijak went to Miss Universe 2008 at Nha Trang, Vietnam and won Best National Costume Award.

Results

Final Results
Color keys

Special awards

Judges
Poranee Lumsum
Preeya Kullavanich
Petcharaporn Watcharapol
Siam Sangworiboot - Publisher Theater 
Sudarat Burapachaisri
Nguyen Thi Giang My - Miss Vietnam 1992
Apasra Hongsakula - Miss Universe 1965
Charm Ivrin Osathanond - Miss Thailand Universe 2006
Thaworn Ko-udomwit
Veeraparb Suparbpaiboon - Casting a man reputation

Delegates

External links 
 Miss Thailand Universe official website
 T-Pageant Club

2008
2008 in Bangkok
2008 beauty pageants
May 2008 events in Thailand
Beauty pageants in Thailand